is the fourth single released by Miki Fujimoto. It was released on 7 November 2002 and went on to sell a total of 43,200 copies, peaking at number four on the Oricon charts.

Track listing
 
 
  (Instrumental)

External links
Boyfriend entry at Up-Front Works

Miki Fujimoto songs
2002 singles
Song recordings produced by Tsunku
2002 songs